The Song of the Scarlet Flower (Swedish: Sången om den eldröda blomman) is a 1956 Swedish drama film directed by Gustaf Molander and starring Jarl Kulle, Anita Björk and Ulla Jacobsson. It was shot at the Råsunda Studios in Stockholm. The film's sets were designed by the art director P.A. Lundgren. It is one of several film adaptations of the 1905 novel The Song of the Blood-Red Flower by Finnish author Johannes Linnankoski.

Cast
 Jarl Kulle as 	Olof Koskela
 Anita Björk as Kyllikki Malm
 Ulla Jacobsson as 	Elli
 Ann-Marie Gyllenspetz as Annika
 Marianne Bengtsson as 	Maria
 Linnéa Hillberg as Olof's Mother
 Gunnel Lindblom as 	Kerstin
 Fylgia Zadig as	Rosa
 Monica Nielsen as 	Britta
 Edvin Adolphson as 	Malm
 Axel Slangus as 	Väinö
 Olof Bergström as Kaleb
 Erik 'Bullen' Berglund as 	Olof's Father 
 Ingvar Kjellson as 	Falk
 Sven-Eric Gamble as 	Stoker
 Ernst Brunman as Wedding Guest
 Arthur Fischer as Wedding Guest
 Birger Lensander as Man in Village 
 Åke Lindström as Raftsman
 Gustaf Hedström as Vicar 
 Hortensia Hedström as 	Vicar's Wife 
 Marrit Ohlsson as 	Maid
 Birger Åsander as Farm Hand

References

Bibliography 
 Iverson, Gunnar, Soderbergh Widding, Astrid & Soila, Tytti. Nordic National Cinemas. Routledge, 2005.
 Qvist, Per Olov & von Bagh, Peter. Guide to the Cinema of Sweden and Finland. Greenwood Publishing Group, 2000.

External links 
 

1956 films
Swedish drama films
1956 drama films
1950s Swedish-language films
Films directed by Gustaf Molander
Swedish black-and-white films
Films based on Finnish novels
Remakes of Swedish films
1950s Swedish films